David Vála (born April 17, 1978 in Liberec) is an amateur Czech Greco-Roman wrestler, who competed in the men's heavyweight category. He won a silver medal in his division at the 2007 European Wrestling Championships in Moscow, Russia, losing out to Russian wrestler and former Olympic champion Khasan Baroyev. Vala is also a three-time Olympian (2000, 2004 and 2012), and a member of the wrestling team for PSK Olymp Praha under his personal coach Ervin Varga.

Vala made his debut at the 2000 Summer Olympics in Sydney, where he competed in the men's super heavyweight division (130 kg). He placed third in a four-person preliminary pool against Israel's Yuri Evseitchik, Turkey's Fatih Bakir, and Poland's Marek Sitnik, accumulating a score of five technical and four classification points.

At the 2004 Summer Olympics in Athens, Vala finished second in the preliminary pool round of the men's 120 kg class, against Baroyev and Belarus' Andrei Chekhauskoi, with a total score of three technical and classification points each.

Eight years after competing in his last Olympics, Vala qualified for his third Czech team, at the age of 34, for the 2012 Summer Olympics in London, by placing second in the men's heavyweight division in the Olympic Qualification Tournament in Helsinki, Finland. He received a bye for the preliminary round of sixteen match in the men's 96 kg class, before losing out to Cuban wrestler and Pan American Games champion Yunior Estrada, with a three-set technical score (0–1, 1–0, 0–1), and a classification point score of 1–3.

References

External links
Profile – International Wrestling Database
NBC Olympics Profile

1978 births
Living people
Wrestlers at the 2000 Summer Olympics
Czech male sport wrestlers
Wrestlers at the 2004 Summer Olympics
Wrestlers at the 2012 Summer Olympics
Olympic wrestlers of the Czech Republic
Sportspeople from Liberec